The Golden Reel Award for Outstanding Achievement in Sound Editing – Sound Effects, Foley, Music, Dialogue and ADR for Live Action Broadcast Media Under 35 Minutes is an annual award given by the Motion Picture Sound Editors. It honors sound editors whose work has warranted merit in the field of television; in this case, their work on episodes with run times 35 or less. The "short form" of the title refers to television episodes that have a runtime of less than one hour, though more than 35 minutes, as those episodes now have their own category. The award has been given with its current title since 2019. Previously, series eligible for this award could be nominated for the short form dialogue & ADR and sound effects & foley categories.

Winners and nominees

2010s

2020s

Programs with multiple nominations

2 nominations
 Ballers (HBO)
 Barry (HBO)
 The Good Place (NBC)
 Star Trek: Short Treks (CBS All Access)
 Servant (Apple TV+)

References

American television awards
Film sound production
Golden Reel Awards (Motion Picture Sound Editors)